Nedeljko Jovanović (born 16 September 1970) is a Serbian former handball player and current coach.

Club career
After playing for Metaloplastika, Jovanović joined Partizan in 1991. He proved instrumental in helping the club win its first ever national championship in the 1992–93 season. Subsequently, Jovanović moved abroad and played for two seasons in Spain with Elgorriaga Bidasoa (1993–94) and Teka Cantabria (1994–95).

In 1995, Jovanović switched to Germany and signed with OSC 04 Rheinhausen. He also played for TV Niederwürzbach, TUSEM Essen and SG Hameln in the Handball-Bundesliga. In August 2001, it was announced that Jovanović would be returning to Spain and joining Portland San Antonio on a three-year contract. He helped the club win the Liga ASOBAL for the first time ever in the 2001–02 season.

After leaving San Antonio, Jovanović played for Algeciras and Arrate (both in Spain), Gold Club (Slovenia), Pick Szeged (Hungary) and HIT Innsbruck (Austria). In August 2010, less than a month shy of his 40th birthday, Jovanović announced his retirement from playing. He previously won the Serbian Handball Super League and Serbian Handball Cup with Kolubara in his last season.

International career
At international level, Jovanović represented FR Yugoslavia in eight major tournaments, winning two bronze medals at the World Championships (1999 and 2001) and one bronze at the European Championships (1996). He also participated in the 2000 Summer Olympics.

Coaching career
After serving as head coach of Novi Pazar for a few months, Jovanović became an assistant to Nenad Peruničić with the Serbia men's national handball team in September 2018. He was dismissed via SMS text message sent by Peruničić just weeks ahead of the 2020 European Championship.

Honours
Partizan
 Handball Championship of FR Yugoslavia: 1992–93
 Handball Cup of FR Yugoslavia: 1992–93
Portland San Antonio
 Liga ASOBAL: 2001–02
 Supercopa ASOBAL: 2001–02, 2002–03
 EHF Cup Winners' Cup: 2003–04
Kolubara
 Serbian Handball Super League: 2009–10
 Serbian Handball Cup: 2009–10

References

External links

 MKSZ record
 Olympic record
 
 

1970 births
Living people
Handball players from Belgrade
Serbian male handball players
Yugoslav male handball players
Competitors at the 1991 Mediterranean Games
Mediterranean Games medalists in handball
Mediterranean Games gold medalists for Yugoslavia
Olympic handball players of Yugoslavia
Handball players at the 2000 Summer Olympics
RK Metaloplastika players
RK Partizan players
CB Cantabria players
TV Niederwürzbach players
SDC San Antonio players
SC Pick Szeged players
RK Kolubara players
Liga ASOBAL players
Handball-Bundesliga players
Expatriate handball players
Serbia and Montenegro expatriate sportspeople in Spain
Serbia and Montenegro expatriate sportspeople in Germany
Serbia and Montenegro expatriate sportspeople in Slovenia
Serbian expatriate sportspeople in Hungary
Serbian expatriate sportspeople in Austria
Serbian handball coaches
Competitors at the 1990 Goodwill Games
Goodwill Games medalists in handball